Simon Gregorčič (15 October 1844 – 24 November 1906) was a Slovene poet and Roman Catholic priest. He is considered the first lyric poet of the Slovene realist poetry and the most melodical Slovene poet.

Biography 
Gregorčič (October 15, 1844 – November 24, 1906) was born in the small mountain village of Vrsno above the Soča river in the County of Gorizia and Gradisca as a second son of a small farmer Jernej Gregorčič and his wife Katarina (maiden name Gaberšček). He had seven siblings. As a young boy he was a shepherd. In 1851, he attended primary school in Libušnje, but was sent to school in Gorizia in 1852. After finishing high school he entered the seminary in Gorizia. He was ordained on October 27, 1867 and became a vicar in Kobarid in September 1868. There he continued with his literary work and together with his friend Ignacij Gruntar in 1871 founded a public reading room. Actually, Ignacij Gruntar was not only very good friend to Simon, but also his patron; in fact, the first poem book by Simon has been published thanks to the financial support of Dr. Ignacij Gruntar, notary in Kobarid and Logatec. In 1872, Dragojila Milek came to Kobarid as a teacher. She was a poet as well. She led the local female choir and she became a secretary of the reading room founded by Gregorčič. His affection to Milek was deemed the reason for his transfer in the spring of 1873. His romantic experience had a great effect on the content of the poet's writing.

In 1873 he was transferred to Rihemberk in the Vipava Valley. After that he was transferred a few more times before retiring in 1903, selling his house and moving into an apartment in Gorizia where he died on November 24, 1906.

Work 
As a student he began writing lyrical poetry which was published in many literary magazines (Slovenski glasnik, Zgodnja Danica, Zvon, Ljubljanski zvon). It is apparent from his work that he was inspired by Romantic poetic forms. Mostly he was writing love, patriotic, life narrative poems and even some epic poems.

His poems, such as the ode "Soči" ("To the Soča"), were patriotic in nature, but he also wrote love poems, such as Kropiti te ne smem ("I am not allowed to bless you"), and worked in other poetic genres. His most important works were Človeka nikar, Ujetega ptiča tožba ("The Snared Bird's Lament"), Moj črni plašč, Veseli pastir, Nazaj v planinski raj, Oljki.

He succeeded with his first collection Prvi zvezek Poezij (1882) and after six years he released his second collection [[Poezijeafourth collection Četrti zvezek Poezij (1908) was released.

Influences: Petrarca, Vodnik, Stritar, Prešeren.

 Bibliography 
 Poezije I (1882)
 Poezije II (1888)
 Poezije III (1902)
 Poezije IV (1908) - published after his death 
 Izbrano delo I-IV'' (1947–1951)

See also 
Anton Aškerc
Simon Rutar
Slovene literature

References

External links 

Simon Gregorčič: Job in psalem 118 – Svetopisemska knjiga
Simon Gregorčič: Poezije – izdaja Družbe sv. Mohorja v Celovcu – 1908
Simon Gregorčič: Jeremijeve žalostinke
 

1844 births
1906 deaths
People from the Municipality of Kobarid
People from Austrian Littoral
Slovenian poets
Slovenian male poets
19th-century Slovenian Roman Catholic priests
Slovenian Catholic poets
19th-century poets